Artorima is a genus of flowering plants from the orchid family, Orchidaceae. At present (May 2014), only one species is known: Artorima erubescens, native to southern Mexico (Guerrero and Oaxaca).

See also 
 List of Orchidaceae genera

References 

 Pridgeon, A.M., Cribb, P.J., Chase, M.C. & Rasmussen, F.N. (2006). Epidendroideae (Part One). Genera Orchidacearum 4: 196 ff. Oxford University Press.
 Berg Pana, H. 2005. Handbuch der Orchideen-Namen. Dictionary of Orchid Names. Dizionario dei nomi delle orchidee. Ulmer, Stuttgart

External links 

Laeliinae genera
Orchids of Mexico
Flora of Oaxaca
Flora of Guerrero
Monotypic Epidendroideae genera
Laeliinae
Flora of the Sierra Madre de Oaxaca
Flora of the Sierra Madre del Sur